Liam Phillip Coleman (born 11 January 1986 in Colchester) is an English ex-professional footballer who is currently retired from football.

Career
Coleman began his career with Colchester United, turning professional in August 2004. He failed to break into the Colchester first team and chose to leave at the end of the 2004–05 season. In July 2005 he joined Torquay United, initially on trial, and made his league debut as a second-half substitute for Darren Garner in a 3–0 defeat away to Mansfield Town on 13 August 2005. He was a regular squad member for the first three months of the season, but lost his place after coming off injured in the first half of the game at home to Northampton Town on 6 December 2005, which turned out to be his final appearance for Torquay.

Coleman joined Forest Green Rovers on loan in January 2006, but left the club at the end of the season. In August 2006 he joined Gravesend & Northfleet, now known as Ebbsfleet United, on a two-year contract. He was released at the end of the 2007–08 season having two successful seasons, one in which Coleman was involved in the FA trophy win at Wembley stadium.

He played for Braintree Town at the start of the 2008–09 season in the Steve Good Testimonial at home to Charlton Athletic.

In December 2008 he signed a short term professional contract for Northwich Victoria. Coleman spent the 2009–10 season at Heybridge Swifts, before joining Aveley prior to the 2010–11 season. His stay was short-lived however, as he joined Clacton on 17 September 2010.

Coleman signed a one-year deal with Margate on 27 July 2011.

In 2012, Coleman took up a director of coaching role in NJ, USA

Personal life
His father, Phil, was a professional player for Millwall, Colchester, Wrexham, and Aldershot. Phil also played for Wivenhoe Town.

References

External links

1986 births
Living people
Sportspeople from Colchester
English footballers
Colchester United F.C. players
Torquay United F.C. players
Forest Green Rovers F.C. players
Ebbsfleet United F.C. players
Heybridge Swifts F.C. players
Wivenhoe Town F.C. players
Northwich Victoria F.C. players
Aveley F.C. players
F.C. Clacton players
Margate F.C. players
National League (English football) players
English Football League players
Association football midfielders